A Baptist Church once stood on the north side of Station Road, New Barnet. The church was designed by W. Allen Dixon and construction was underway by 21 May 1872, when a memorial stone was laid. It was built of gault and yellow stock brick with stone dressings. The front featured a three bay Palladian temple front. The church was a grade II listed building with English Heritage. It was demolished to make way for flats around 1982.

See also
New Barnet Congregational Church

References 

New Barnet
Churches in the London Borough of Barnet
Former Baptist churches in England
Churches completed in 1872
1872 in London
Destroyed churches in London
Buildings designed by W. Allen Dixon
Grade II listed buildings in the London Borough of Barnet